McVeagh of the South Seas is a 1914 American drama film directed by and starring Harry Carey. The film was reissued under the title Brute Island and has been released on DVD under that title.

Plot
A shipwreck near the Solomon Islands leaves San Franciscan Harmon Darrell (Terry) and his daughter Nancy (Butler) adrift in a lifeboat. Cyril McVeagh (Carey) a ship's captain reduced to drunkenness and brutality by his shattered love affair with Nancy, rules one of the islands, accompanied only by his deranged mate "Pearly" Gates (Russell) and the island's natives. McVeagh is about to marry Liana (Foster), a native who loves him but is desired by Pearly, when Nancy arrives on the island, horrified at McVeagh's dissipation. Tanarka, Liana's former betrothed, leads a native rebellion against McVeagh, who sends Nancy away in a boat before the attack. McVeagh struggles with his crazed mate in his burning shack before Pearly recovers his reason and the two hurriedly leave the island. Liana, believing McVeagh dead, remains behind to mourn him, while McVeagh sets a course for San Francisco and civilization.

Cast
 Harry Carey as Cyril Bruce McVeagh
 Fern Foster as Liana
 Herbert Russell as "Pearly" Gates
 Kathleen Butler as Nancy Darrell
 Jack Terry as Harmon Darrell

See also
 Harry Carey filmography

References

External links

1914 films
American silent feature films
American black-and-white films
1914 drama films
Films directed by Harry Carey
Silent American drama films
1910s American films